Serge Pelissou is an electrical engineer at the Hydro-Québec Research Institute (IREQ) in Varennes, Quebec. He was named a Fellow of the Institute of Electrical and Electronics Engineers (IEEE) in 2013 for his work to characterize extruded cables and components in their life cycles.

References

Fellow Members of the IEEE
Living people
Year of birth missing (living people)
Place of birth missing (living people)